Coeur d'Alene's Old Mission State Park is a heritage-oriented state park in the western United States in northern Idaho, preserving the Mission of the Sacred Heart, or Cataldo Mission, national historic landmark. The park contains the church itself, the parish house, and the surrounding property. Built 1850–1853, Mission of the Sacred Heart is the oldest standing building in Idaho. It was designated a National Historic Landmark in 1961, and put on the National Register of Historic Places in 1966.

History

In 1831, the Nez Perce and Flathead people had heard of the Bible and wanted more information on Christianity. They sent six men east to St. Louis with four arriving, and in 1842, Father Pierre-Jean De Smet responded to the request and came to the area. Fr. Nicholas Point and Br. Charles Huet came and helped to pick a mission location. The first chosen was along the St. Joe River and was subject to flooding. In 1846, they moved it to its current location.

In 1850, the church was taken over by the Italian Jesuit missionary Antonio Ravalli, who began designing the new mission building. He had the building constructed by the Indians themselves, so they would feel part of the church. It was built using the wattle and daub method, and finished some three years later without using nails.

The mission was named after the Sacred Heart of Jesus and the spot was renamed the Coeur d'Alenes Old Mission State Park by the Coeur d'Alene Tribe. A misnomer locally is to refer to the whole mission as the "Cataldo" Mission. This term cropped up in the area due to the fame of Father Giuseppe Cataldo, a Sicilian priest born in the village of Terrasini, who spent most of his Jesuit life in the frontier community and founded Gonzaga University in Spokane. The nearest town to the mission is Cataldo, and with time, the mission became an important hospitality stop and supply station for traders, settlers, and miners traveling on the Mullan Road. It was also a working port for boats heading up the Coeur d'Alene River.

In 1976, a major restoration of the church was chosen as Idaho State's Bicentennial Project to celebrate the nation's bicentennial.

Mission area

Church
Though they had few materials to decorate the church, they used ingenious techniques to beautify it. The walls were decorated with fabric bought from the Hudson's Bay Company and hand-painted newspaper from Philadelphia that Fr. Ravalli had received in the mail. Tin cans were used to create an idea of chandeliers. Both wooden statues were carved by hand by Fr. Rivalli with nothing but a knife and were intended to look like marble. The blue coloring of the interior wood is not paint but a stain created by pressing local huckleberries into the wood.

Parish house
After being burnt down, it was rebuilt in 1887. It is a two-story building, the upstairs used for sleeping quarters, and the downstairs for daily activities. It contains a smaller chapel, mostly used for daily Mass.

State park
The surrounding property has two cemeteries, a nature trail, and a visitors center. The site became Old Mission State Park in 1975 through a long-term lease with the Roman Catholic Diocese of Boise.

See also
 List of the oldest churches in the United States
 List of National Historic Landmarks in Idaho
 National Register of Historic Places listings in Kootenai County, Idaho
 List of Idaho state parks
 List of Jesuit sites
 National Parks in Idaho

References

Further reading

 Cody, Edmund R., History of the Coeur d’Alene Mission of the Sacred Heart. Kellogg, Id.: Progressive Printing & Supplies, 1930.

External links

 Coeur d'Alene's Old Mission State Park Idaho Parks and Recreation
 Coeur d'Alene's Old Mission State Park Map Idaho Parks and Recreation

History museums in Idaho
State parks of Idaho
Protected areas of Kootenai County, Idaho
Museums in Cataldo, Idaho
National Historic Landmarks in Idaho
Native American history of Idaho
Native American museums in Idaho
Churches on the National Register of Historic Places in Idaho
Protected areas established in 1975
1975 establishments in Idaho
Former Roman Catholic church buildings in Idaho
National Register of Historic Places in Kootenai County, Idaho
Parks on the National Register of Historic Places in Idaho